Mishō-ryū Sasaoka (未生流笹岡) is a Japanese school of ikebana.

References

External links 
 Official homepage 

Kadō schools